There Ain't No Justice is a 1939 British sports drama film directed by Pen Tennyson and starring Jimmy Hanley, Edward Chapman and Edward Rigby. The film is based on the 1937 novel of the same name by James Curtis.

Plot summary
Tommy Mutch (Jimmy Hanley) is a garage mechanic and small-time boxer. With his family in financial difficulty he needs to find money in a hurry. As luck would have it he meets boxing manager Sammy Sanders (Edward Chapman). Sammy assures Tommy he can get him lucrative main event bouts.

Tommy is promoted as the next boxing star which is reinforced with a series of convincing wins. However, Tommy discovers that the bouts were fixed by a gambling syndicate. He realises now that he has been set up by his manager and is expected to take a fall.

He has little choice but to go-ahead but needs to come up with a plan. One that will guarantee a financial return for his family while also hitting the syndicates in the pocket.

Cast
 Jimmy Hanley as Tommy Mutch 
 Edward Rigby as Pa Mutch 
 Mary Clare as Ma Mutch 
 Phyllis Stanley as Elsie Mutch 
 Edward Chapman as Sammy Sanders 
 Jill Furse as Connie Fletcher 
 Nan Hopkins as Dot Ducrow 
 Richard Ainley as Billy Frist 
 Gus McNaughton as Alfie Norton 
 Sue Gawthorne as Mrs. Frost 
 Michael Hogarth as Frank Fox 
 Michael Wilding as Len Charteris 
 Richard Norris as Stan 
 Al Millen as Perce 
 John Boxer as Mr Short
 James Knight as Police Constable

Production
James Curtis adapted his own novel, There Ain't No Justice to provide the screenplay for the film. He had done so the year before for one of his own novels, They Drive By Night, for the film of the same name. As with that adaptation he found himself having to remove areas of dialogue and story that would not get by the censors of the time. Many of these would be depictions of graphic violence against men rather than the sexual nature of his previous novel.

This was the first film directed by Pen Tennyson, who had served as Assistant Director to Alfred Hitchcock from 1934. He would go on to direct two further films before being killed during World War II.

The film features an uncredited role by real life boxer Bombardier Billy Wells, best remembered as one of the gongmen featured in the Rank Organisation films logo.

Release and reception

It was released theatrically in the UK with the slogan "Real people, Real problems, a human document". Due in part to its distinctive realistic portrayal of the boxing world it became a critical success.
However, the author Graham Greene, having praised the previous year's James Curtis adaptation (They Drive by Night), was not convinced. He considered the film to be timid and too refined in its depiction of the subject matter.

It is available on DVD in the UK on Volume Eight of Network's Ealing Studios Rarities Collection. It is often shown at film revivals in both the US and UK and was shown in May 2010 as part of BFI Southbank's "Capital Tales" season. It was also shown on the London Live television channel on Sunday 13th Sept 2015.

References

External links

There Ain't No Justice at BFI Film Database

1939 films
1930s sports drama films
British sports drama films
British crime drama films
Films based on British novels
1939 crime drama films
British black-and-white films
British boxing films
Films set in London
Ealing Studios films
1939 directorial debut films
Films directed by Pen Tennyson
Films with screenplays by Pen Tennyson
1930s English-language films
1930s British films